Beech Grove, Kentucky may refer to:
Beech Grove, Bullitt County, Kentucky
Beech Grove, Carter County, Kentucky
Beech Grove, McLean County, Kentucky